Highlands is a neighborhood in northwestern Lexington, Kentucky, United States. Its boundaries are Georgetown Road to the west, Oakwood Park to the east, and Citation Boulevard to the east. There are plans to develop a vacant field north of Highlands, it is unclear whether it will become part of Highlands or be a separate neighborhood.

Neighborhood statistics
 Area: 
 Population as of 2000: 366
 Population density: 3,067 people per square mile (1,180.6/km2)
 Median household income: $59,111

References

Neighborhoods in Lexington, Kentucky